The 2011 Echo Klassik Awards were held on October 2, 2011. It is the 19th edition of the annual Echo Klassik awards for classical music. The ceremony took place in the Konzerthaus Berlin and was broadcast on ZDF. It was hosted by Thomas Gottschalk.

Winners
The winners of the 2011 Echo Klassik awards were: 
Female Singer of the Year – Simone Kermes - Colori d'Amore 
Male Singer of the Year – Thomas Hampson - Des Knaben Wunderhorn 
Conductor of the Year – Andris Nelsons for Stravinsky
Instrumentalists of the Year
Accordion - Teodoro Anzellotti 
Violin - Lisa Batiashvili 
Guitar - Frank Bungarten 
Cello - Truls Mørk
Piano - Murray Perahia
Ensemble of the Year
 Modern Instruments – Hagen Quartet
 Historical Instruments – Hespèrion XXI 
 Vocal Music – Huelgas Ensemble
 Lifetime Achievement Award – Zubin Mehta
 Newcomer awards 
Vocals Vittorio Grigolo
Violin Ray Chen; Vilde Frang
Cello Maximilian Hornung
Clarinet Sebastian Manz
Oboe Ramón Ortega Quero
Piano Anna Vinnitskaya; Yuja Wang
Conductor Robin Ticciati (BR-Chor/Bamberg Symphony/Alice Coote)
 The Klassik-ohne-Grenzen Prizes – David Orlowsky/Singer Pur - Jeremiah; Spark - Downtown Illusions; Rolando Villazón Mexico!
 Symphonic Recording of the Year
18th century - Charles Mackerras/Scottish Chamber Orchestra for Mozart Symphonies
19th century – David Zinman/Tonhalle Orchester Zürich/WDR Rundfunkorchester Köln for Mahler: Symphony No. 8
20th/21st century – Pierre Boulez/Wiener Philharmoniker for Song of the Night
 Concerto Recording of the Year
18th century Sergio Azzolini/L'aura Soave Cremona - Vivaldi
19th century 
Organ - Stefan Bleicher/Douglas Boyd/Musikkollegium Winterthur - Rheinberger
Cello - Sol Gabetta - Elgar
Violin - Susanna Yoko Henkel/Duisburger Philharmoniker/Jonathan Darlington - Tchaikovsky
20th/21st century – Hilary Hahn for Higdon & Tchaikovsky
 Opera Recording of the Year
17th/18th century – Fabio Biondi/Europa Galante - Vivaldi: Ercole sul Termondonte
19th century – Not awarded
20th/21st century – Stefan Blunier/Beethoven Orchester Bonn/Chor des Theaters Bonn - Eugen d'Albert: Der Golem. 
Operatic Arias & Duets – Bejun Mehta - Händel: Ombra Cara; René Pape/Staatskapelle Berlin: Wagner.
 Choral Recording of the Year
16th/ 17th century – Christina Pluhar/L'Arpeggiata - Monteverdi:Vespro della Beate Virgine
18th/19th century – Christoph Spering/Das Neue Orchester/Chorus Musicus Köln - Mendelssohn Bartholdy: Elias 
20th/21st century – Marcus Creed/SWR Vokalensemble Stuttgart - Heitor Villa-Lobos: Chorwerke
 Chamber Music Recording of the Year 
17th/18th century - Hille Perl/Dorothee Mields/Lee Santana - Loves Alchymie
19th century - Artemis Quartet; Viktoria Mullova/Kristian Bezuidenhout
20th/21st century
Mixed Ensemble - musikFabrik  
Strings  - Quatuor Ebène
Wind - Quintette Aquilon

 Solo Recording of the Year
17th/18th century – Alexandre Tharaud - Scarlatti: Sonates
19th century - Piotr Anderszewski - Schumann
20th/21st century - Henrico Stewen (Marcel Punt) - Reger
Song Recording of the Year – Diana Damrau - Strauss: Poesie
 Editorial Achievement of the Year – Ben van Oosten - Marcel Dupré: Orgelwerke
 World Premiere Recording of the Year – Manfred Honeck/Swedish Radio Symphony Orchestra - Braunfels: Jeanne D'Arc
 The Classics for Children Award – Thomas Honickel/Christian Firmbach/Beethoven Orchester Bonn - Komm, wir fahren nach Amerika
 Jury Awards for the Fostering of Young Talents – Not given
 Music DVD Recording of the Year 
Opera - Cecilia Bartoli - Halévy: Clari
Documentary - Peter Rosen - A Surprise in Texas - The Thirteenth Van Cliburn International Piano Competition; Eric Schulz/[rank Gerdes - Carlos Kleiber - Traces To Nowhere
Surround Performance of the Year - Christian Zacharias/Orchestre de Chambre de Lausanne - Mozart
 Bestseller of the Year – Lang Lang Live in Vienna
 Special Social Engagement Award – José Antonio Abreu

References

Echo Klassic
Echo Klassic 2011
Echo Klassic 2011